Álvaro Ricardo Faustino Gomes (born 3 September 1990), known as Alvarinho, is a Portuguese professional footballer who plays for Louletano D.C. as a winger.

Club career

Early career
Born in Faro, Algarve, Alvarinho began his career at hometown club S.C. Farense in 2009 before a transfer to F.C. Paços de Ferreira a year later. He made his professional debut in his only Primeira Liga appearance for the latter, a 5–1 home win over Académica de Coimbra on the last day of the 2010–11 season, coming on as a 77th-minute substitute for Manuel José.

A serious injury limited Alvarinho's prospects at Paços, and after loans to third division sides C.D. Fátima and S.C.U. Torreense, he joined Sport Benfica e Castelo Branco of the same tier in 2012.

Poland
Halfway through the 2013–14 campaign, after he scored seven goals with Benfica, Alvarinho and strike partner Marocas trained at Zawisza Bydgoszcz of the Polish Ekstraklasa, and the former eventually made the move permanent. He won the Polish Cup also that year, playing the final nine minutes of extra time in place of Jakub Wójcicki; the game finished goalless and he scored in the penalty shootout against Zagłębie Lubin at the Stadion Narodowy.

On 9 July 2014, now under compatriot manager Jorge Paixão, Alvarinho scored as Zawisza defeated league champions Legia Warsaw 3–2 at the Polish Army Stadium in the Polish SuperCup. However, his team was relegated in 2015 and he remained in the top flight, signing for Jagiellonia Białystok on 20 August. A year later, he was loaned to a third team of the league, Śląsk Wrocław.

Return to Portugal
On 30 August 2017, Alvarinho returned to Farense and the Portuguese third tier, now renamed Campeonato de Portugal. In his first season they were promoted to LigaPro as runners-up to C.D. Mafra, and at the end of the second, he signed a new two-year contract featuring an undisclosed release clause.

Honours
Zawisza Bydgoszcz
Polish Cup: 2013–14
Polish SuperCup: 2014

References

External links
 

1990 births
Living people
People from Faro, Portugal
Sportspeople from Faro District
Portuguese footballers
Association football wingers
Primeira Liga players
Liga Portugal 2 players
Segunda Divisão players
S.C. Farense players
F.C. Paços de Ferreira players
C.D. Fátima players
S.C.U. Torreense players
Sport Benfica e Castelo Branco players
Louletano D.C. players
Ekstraklasa players
I liga players
Zawisza Bydgoszcz players
Jagiellonia Białystok players
Śląsk Wrocław players
Portuguese expatriate footballers
Expatriate footballers in Poland
Portuguese expatriate sportspeople in Poland